In organometallic chemistry, a flyover complex features two metals bridged by the fragment OC(RC=CR)2.  Some flyover complexes are symmetrical and some are not.

Common examples are the iron carbonyl derivatives, which are typically air-stable, soluble in nonpolar solvents, and red-orange in color. These diiron complexes arise by the reaction of alkynes with iron carbonyls.  Such reactions are known to generate many products, e.g. complexes of cyclopentadienones and para-quinones.  

Some ferrole complexes react with tertiary phosphines to give the substituted flyover complex Fe2(CO)5(PR3)(C4R4CO).  They insert alkynes en route to tropones (R6C7O).

References

Organoiron compounds
Carbonyl complexes